Tage Holm Fredrik Grönwall (7 February 1903 – 6 March 1988) was a Swedish diplomat.

Early life
Grönwall was born on 7 February 1903 in Stockholm, Sweden, the son of consul general Fredrik Grönwall and his wife Anna (née Holm). He passed his studentexamen in Djursholm in 1921 and earned a Candidate of Law degree from Stockholm University College in 1927.

Career
Grönwall did his clerkship in Linde Judicial District from 1928 to 1930 before he became attaché at the Ministry for Foreign Affairs in 1930. Grönwall served in Paris in 1931, London in 1932, Dublin in 1933 and in Vienna, Belgrade and Budapest in 1934. He was the acting first secretary at the Foreign Ministry in 1937 (acting second secretary in 1934), acting first secretary of legation in London from 1939 and 1940, acting director at the Foreign Ministry in 1943 and mission counsellor in Rome from 1947 to 1951. Grönwall was envoy in Athens from 1951 to 1956, envoy in Tokyo from 1956 to 1957 and ambassador in Tokyo from 1957 to 1962. He was at the same time envoy in Seoul from 1959 to 1960 and ambassador from 1960 to 1962 whilst stationed in Tokyo. Grönwall was ambassador in Brussels from 1965 to 1969.

He became chairman of Stockholm University College's legal association in 1927 and was an employee of Swedish Law Journal (Svensk juristtidning) from 1941 to 1947. Grönwall was member of the Foreign Capital Control Office (Flyktkapitalbyrån) from 1945 to 1947 and was a representative in negotiations on trade policy matters in Stockholm in 1945, Washington, D.C. in 1946, Rome in 1948 and in Annecy in 1949. He was mediator in the Neutral Nations Supervisory Commission in Korea from 1954 to 1955 and head of the Swedish Delegation from 25 September 1969 to 31 March 1970. Grönwall was chairman of Solvay Svenska AB from 1969 to 1979, Marshal of the Diplomatic Corps (Introduktör av främmande sändebud) from 1975 to 1979 and chairman of the Swedish-Belgian Association from 1976 to 1979.

Personal life
In 1929, Grönwall married Inger Ericson (born 1908), daughter of Admiral Hans Ericson and Elin Gadelius. He was the father of Anita (born 1930) and Hans-Fredrik (born 1939).

Awards
  Commander 1st Class of the Order of the Polar Star
  Grand Cross of the Order of the Phoenix
  Commander of the Order of St. Olav (1 July 1947)
  Officer of the Order of Vytautas the Great
  Officer of the Order of Polonia Restituta
  Knight of the Order of the Crown

References

Ambassadors of Sweden to Greece
Ambassadors of Sweden to Japan
Ambassadors of Sweden to South Korea
Ambassadors of Sweden to Belgium
Stockholm University alumni
People from Stockholm
1988 deaths
1903 births
20th-century Swedish people